Juscak Joshua Marthen Isir (born 13 June 2001) is an Indonesian professional footballer who plays as a winger for Liga 2 club Persipura Jayapura.

Club career

Persipura Jayapura
He was signed for Persipura Jayapura to play in Liga 1 in the 2021 season. Isir made his first-team debut on 28 August 2021 as a substitute in a match against Persita Tangerang at the Pakansari Stadium, Cibinong.

Career statistics

Club

Notes

References

External links
 Joshua Isir at Soccerway
 Joshua Isir at Liga Indonesia

2001 births
Living people
Indonesian footballers
Persipura Jayapura players
Liga 1 (Indonesia) players
Association football wingers
People from Jayapura
Sportspeople from Papua